Rudolf Böhm was an ethnic German politician and businessman in the First Czechoslovak Republic. Böhm was born in Košice on 6 August 1884. From the early 1920s, he was part of the Provincial Christian-Socialist Party leadership in Bratislava. He stood as candidate for the Senate in the 1925 Czechoslovak parliamentary election. He was elected to the Senate in the 1929 Czechoslovak parliamentary election. He died on 19 January 1933.

References

1884 births
1933 deaths
Politicians from Košice
People from the Kingdom of Hungary
Provincial Christian-Socialist Party politicians
Members of the Senate of Czechoslovakia (1929–1935)
Carpathian German people